Hot and Cold may refer to:

Songs
"Hot n Cold", by Katy Perry
"Hot n Cold", by Albert Collins 1965
"Hot and Cold", by Marvin Rainwater 1956
"Hot and Cold", by Kate Miller-Heidke (with Yanto Browning)
"Hot and Cold", by Jermaine Stewart and co-written by Andy Summers, 1989
"Hot and Cold", by Eels on their album Oh What a Beautiful Morning, 2000
"Hot and Cold", by Ex Hex released on Merge Records
"Hot and Cold", by Fly to the Sky from Sea of Love
"Hot and Cold", by Kiss from Sonic Boom
"Hot and Cold", by MxPx from Let It Happen

Other
Hot and Cold (game), party game also known as Hunt the Thimble
Hot and Cold (film) 1933 Pooch the Pup cartoon